Typocerus gloriosus is a species of flower longhorn in the beetle family Cerambycidae. It is found in North America.

References

Further reading

 
 

Lepturinae
Articles created by Qbugbot
Beetles described in 1922